Harutaeographa loeffleri is a moth of the family Noctuidae. It is found in Myanmar.

References

Moths described in 2010
Orthosiini